The Twelve Tribes of Israel are, according to Hebrew scriptures, the descendants of the biblical patriarch Jacob, also known as Israel, through his twelve sons through his wives, Leah and Rachel, and his concubines, Bilhah and Zilpah, who collectively form the Israelite nation. In modern scholarship, there is skepticism as to whether there ever were twelve Israelite tribes, with the use of the number 12 thought more likely to signify a symbolic tradition as part of a national founding myth.

Biblical narrative

Genealogy 
Jacob, later called Israel, was the second-born son of Isaac and Rebecca, the younger twin brother of Esau, and the grandson of Abraham and Sarah. According to biblical texts, he was chosen by God to be the patriarch of the Israelite nation. From what is known of Jacob, he had two wives, sisters Leah and Rachel, and two concubines, Bilhah and Zilpah, by whom he had thirteen children. The twelve sons form the basis for the twelve tribes of Israel, listed in the order from oldest to youngest: Reuben, Simeon, Levi, Judah, Dan, Naphtali, Gad, Asher, Issachar, Zebulun, Joseph, and Benjamin. Jacob was known to display favoritism among his children, particularly for Joseph and Benjamin, the sons of his favorite wife, Rachel, and so the tribes themselves were not treated equally in a divine sense. Joseph, despite being the second-youngest son, received double the inheritance of his brothers, treated as if he were the firstborn son instead of Reuben, and so his tribe was later split into two tribes, named after his sons, Ephraim and Manasseh.

Sons and tribes 

The Israelites were the twelve sons of the biblical patriarch Jacob. Jacob also had one daughter, Dinah, whose descendants were not recognized as a separate tribe.
The sons of Jacob were born in Padan-aram from different mothers, as follows:
 The sons of Leah; Reuben (Jacob's firstborn), Simeon, Levi, Judah, Issachar, and Zebulun
 The sons of Rachel; Joseph and Benjamin (Jacob's last-born)
 The sons of Bilhah, Rachel's handmaid; Dan and Naphtali
 The sons of Zilpah, Leah's handmaid; Gad and Asher

 lists the twelve tribes:

 Reuben (Hebrew  Rəʼūḇēn)
 Simeon ( Šīməʻōn)
 Levi ( Lēwī)
 Judah ( Yəhūdā)
 Issachar ( Yīssāšḵār)
 Zebulun ( Zəḇūlun)
 Dan ( Dān)
 Naphtali ( Nap̄tālī)
 Gad ( Gāḏ)
 Asher ( ’Āšēr)
 Benjamin ( Bīnyāmīn)
 Joseph ( Yōsēp̄), later split into two "half-tribes":
 Ephraim ( ’Ep̄rayīm)
 Manasseh ( Mənašše)

Jacob elevated the descendants of Ephraim and Manasseh (the two sons of Joseph and his Egyptian wife Asenath) to the status of full tribes in their own right due to Joseph receiving a double portion after Reuben lost his birth right because of his transgression with Bilhah.

In the biblical narrative the period from the conquest of Canaan under the leadership of Joshua until the formation of the United Kingdom of Israel passed with the tribes forming a loose confederation, described in the Book of Judges. Modern scholarship has called into question the beginning, middle, and end of this picture and the account of the conquest under Joshua has largely been abandoned. The Bible's depiction of the 'period of the Judges' is widely considered doubtful. The extent to which a united Kingdom of Israel ever existed is also a matter of ongoing dispute.

Living in exile in the sixth century BCE, the prophet Ezekiel has a vision for the restoration of Israel, of a future in which the twelve tribes of Israel are living in their land again.

Land allotment 

According to Joshua 13–19, the Land of Israel was divided into twelve sections corresponding to the twelve tribes of Israel. However, the tribes receiving land differed from the biblical tribes. The Tribe of Levi had no land appropriation but had six Cities of Refuge under their administration as well as the Temple in Jerusalem. There was no land allotment for the Tribe of Joseph, but Joseph's two sons, Ephraim and Manasseh, received their father's land portion.

Thus the tribes receiving an allotment were:

 Reuben
 Simeon
 Ephraim
 Judah
 Issachar
 Zebulun
 Dan
 Naphtali
 Gad
 Asher
 Manasseh
 Benjamin

Descendants
 The Tribe of Reuben: Reuben was a member of the Northern Kingdom of Israel until the kingdom was conquered by Assyria. According to 1 Chronicles 5:26, Tiglath-Pileser III of Assyria (ruled 745–727 BC) deported the Reubenites, Gadites, and the half-tribe of Manasseh to "Halah, Habor, Hara, and the Gozan River." According to the Moabite Mesha Stele (ca. 840 BCE) the Moabites reclaimed many territories in the second part of the 9th century BCE (only recently conquered by Omri and Ahab according to the Stele). The stele does mention fighting against the tribe of Gad but not the tribe of Reuben, even though taking Nebo and Jahaz which were in the centre in their designated homeland. This would suggest that the tribe of Reuben at this time was no longer recognizable as a separate force in this area. Even if still present at the outbreak of this war, the outcome of this war would have left them without a territory of their own, just like the tribes of Simeon and Levi. This is, according to Richard Elliot Friedman in "Who wrote the Bible?", the reason why these three tribes are passed over in favour of Judah in the J-version of Jacob's deathbed blessing (composed in Judah before the fall of Israel).
 The Tribe of Simeon: An apocryphal midrash claims that the tribe was deported by the Babylonians to the Kingdom of Aksum (in what is now Ethiopia), to a place behind the dark mountains.
 The Tribe of Ephraim: As part of the Kingdom of Israel, the territory of Ephraim was conquered by the Assyrians, and the tribe exiled; the manner of their exile led to their further history being lost.  However, several modern day groups claim descent, with varying levels of academic and rabbinical support.  The Samaritans claim that some of their adherents are descended from this tribe, and many Persian Jews claim to be descendants of Ephraim.  Further afield, in India the Telugu Jews claim descent from Ephraim, and call themselves Bene Ephraim, relating similar traditions to those of the Mizo Jews, whom the modern state of Israel regards as descendants of Manasseh.
 The Tribe of Issachar: R' David Kimchi (ReDaK) to I Chronicles 9:1 expounds that there remained from the tribes of Ephraim, Manasseh, Issachar and Zebulun in the territory of Judah after the exile of the ten tribes. This remnant returned with the tribe of Judah after the Babylonian Exile.The Tribe of Issachar
 The Tribe of Zebulun: As part of the Kingdom of Israel, the territory of Zebulun was conquered by the Assyrians, and the tribe exiled; the manner of their exile led to their further history being lost. Israeli Knesset member Ayoob Kara speculated that the Druze are descended from one of the Lost Tribes of Israel, probably Zevulun. Kara stated that the Druze share many of the same beliefs as Jews, and that he has genetic evidence to prove that the Druze were descended from Jews.
 The Tribes of Dan; Gad; Asher and Naphtali: Ethiopian Jews, also known as Beta Israel, claim descent from the Tribe of Dan, whose members migrated south along with members of the tribes of Gad, Asher, and Naphtali, into the Kingdom of Kush, now Ethiopia and Sudan, during the destruction of the First Temple. As noted above the Tribe of Simeon was also deported to the Kingdom of Aksum (in what is now Ethiopia).
 The Tribe of Manasseh: Part of the Kingdom of Israel, the territory of Manasseh was conquered by the Assyrians, and the tribe exiled; the manner of their exile led to their further history being lost. However, several modern day groups claim descent, with varying levels of academic and rabbinical support. Both the Bnei Menashe (the Mizo Jews, whom the modern state of Israel regards as descendants of Manasseh) and the Samaritans claim that some of their adherents are descended from this tribe.
 The Tribe of Benjamin apparently became part of the Tribe of Judah.

In Christianity 
The twelve tribes of Israel are referred to in the New Testament. In the gospels of Matthew and Luke, Jesus anticipates that in the Kingdom of God his disciples will "sit on [twelve] thrones, judging the twelve tribes of Israel". The Epistle of James addresses his audience as "the twelve tribes which are scattered abroad".

The Book of Revelation gives a list of the twelve tribes. However, the Tribe of Dan is omitted while Joseph is mentioned alongside Manasseh. In the vision of the Heavenly Jerusalem, the tribes' names (the names of the twelve sons of Jacob) are written on the city gates ( & ).

In the Church of Jesus Christ of Latter-day Saints, a patriarchal blessing usually contains a declaration of the lineage of the recipient of blessing in relation to the twelve tribes of Israel.

In Islam 
The Quran (7th century CE) states that the people of Moses were split into twelve tribes. Surah 7 (Al-A'raf) verse 160 says:
<p>"We split them up into twelve tribal communities, and We revealed to Moses, when his people asked him for water, [saying], ‘Strike the rock with your cane,’ whereat twelve fountains gushed forth from it. Every tribe came to know its drinking-place. And We shaded them with clouds, and We sent down to them manna and quails: ‘Eat of the good things We have provided you.’ And they did not wrong Us, but they used to wrong [only] themselves."

Historicity

Scholarly examination 
For thousands of years, Christians and Jews have accepted the history of the twelve tribes as fact. Since the 19th century, however, historical criticism has examined the veracity of the historical account; whether the twelve tribes ever existed as they are described, the historicity of the eponymous ancestors, and even whether the earliest version of this tradition assumes the existence of twelve tribes. The idea of twelve tribes has been described as "late Judahite" (i.e. 7th–6th century BCE). For example:
 The Blessing of Jacob directly mentions Reuben, Simeon, Levi, Judah, Zebulun, Issachar, Dan, Gad, Asher, Naphtali, Joseph, and Benjamin and especially extolls Joseph over his brothers.
 Blessing of Moses mentions Benjamin, Joseph, Zebulun, Issachar, Gad, Dan, Naphtali, Asher, Reuben, Levi, and Judah, omitting Simeon.
 Judges 1 describes the conquest of Canaan; Benjamin and Simeon are mentioned in the section about Judah's exploits, and are listed alongside the Calebites and the Kenites,  Joseph, Ephraim, Manasseh, Zebulun, Asher, Naphtali and Dan are mentioned, but Issachar, Reuben, Levi and Gad are not.
 the Song of Deborah, widely acknowledged as one of the oldest passages in the Bible, mentions eight of the tribes: Ephraim, Benjamin, Zebulun, Issachar, Reuben, Dan, Asher, and Naphtali. The people of the Gilead region, and Machir, a subsection of Manasseh, are also mentioned. The other five tribes are not mentioned.
 The Rechabites and the Jerahmeelites are also presented as Israelite tribes elsewhere in the Hebrew Bible, but never feature in any list of tribes of Israel.
 Operating by the documentary hypothesis:
 The Jahwist source relates the births of Reuben, then Simeon, Levi, and Judah. Joseph and Dinah, both appearing without birth narratives, are introduced separately in the succeeding chapters, Benjamin is introduced during the episode where Joseph's brothers seek relief from famine in Egypt, along with the notion that Joseph had "ten brethren", however, if one considers the Blessing of Jacob as having originally been a separate piece, the rest of the sons of Jacob are never named.
 The Elohist source relates the births of Dan, Naphtali, Gad, and Asher. Reuben, appearing without a birth narrative, is then described as bringing mandrakes to his mother Leah, who then gives birth to Issachar, Zebulun, and Dinah. Simeon is introduced as the sole outcrier against his brother's plans to sell Joseph into slavery, Ephraim and Manasseh are later introduced as Joseph's sons, and even later Levi is subsequently introduced only in the narrative of Moses' birth. Judah is never mentioned.

Theories of origin 
Scholars such as Max Weber (in Ancient Judaism) and Ronald M. Glassman (2017) concluded that there never was a fixed number of tribes. Instead, the idea that there were always twelve tribes should be regarded as part of the Israelite national founding myth: the number 12 was not a real number, but an ideal number, which had symbolic significance in Near Eastern cultures with duodecimal counting systems, from which, among other things, the modern 12-hour clock is derived.

Biblical scholar Arthur Peake saw the tribes originating as postdiction, as eponymous metaphor giving an aetiology of the connectedness of the tribe to others in the Israelite confederation.

Translator Paul Davidson argued: "The stories of Jacob and his children, then, are not accounts of historical Bronze Age people. Rather, they tell us how much later Jews and Israelites understood themselves, their origins, and their relationship to the land, within the context of folktales that had evolved over time." He goes on to argue that most of the tribal names are "not personal names, but the names of ethnic groups, geographical regions, and local deities. E.g. Benjamin, meaning "son of the south" (the location of its territory relative to Samaria), or Asher, a Phoenician territory whose name may be an allusion to the goddess Asherah."

Historian Dr. Immanuel Lewy in Commentary mentions "the Biblical habit of representing clans as persons. In the Bible, the twelve tribes of Israel are sons of a man called Jacob or Israel, as Edom or Esau is the brother of Jacob, and Ishmael and Isaac are the sons of Abraham. Elam and Ashur, names of two ancient nations, are sons of a man called Shem. Sidon, a Phoenician town, is the first-born of Canaan; the lands of Egypt and Abyssinia are the sons of Ham. This kind of mythological geography is widely known among all ancient peoples. Archaeology has found that many of these personal names of ancestors originally were the names of clans, tribes, localities, or nations. […] if the names of the twelve tribes of Israel are those of mythological ancestors and not of historical persons, then many stories of the patriarchal and Mosaic age lose their historic validity. They may indeed partly reflect dim reminiscences of the Hebrews' tribal past, but in their specific detail they are fiction." On the same subject, Gijsbert J.B. Sulman wrote that the idea of common ancestry should be seen as "an expression of solidarity of different ethnic groups, who merged over time to form one nation", and that the practice of inventing common ancestry is also known among the Bedouin.

Norman Gottwald argued that the division into twelve tribes originated as an administrative scheme under King David.

Additionally, the Mesha Stele (carved c. 840 BCE) mentions Omri as King of Israel and also mentions "the men of Gad".

Attributed coats of arms

Attributed arms are Western European coats of arms given retrospectively to persons real or fictitious who died before the start of the age of heraldry in the latter half of the 12th century.

Attributed arms of the Twelve Tribes from the Portuguese , 1675

See also

 Black Judaism
 Israel (the modern state, founded in 1948 CE)
 Kingdom of Israel (the northern kingdom, according to scriptural accounts, it existed from 930 to 722 BCE)
 Kingdom of Judah (the southern kingdom, according to scriptural accounts, it existing from 930 to 586 BCE)
 List of Jewish states and dynasties
 Ten Lost Tribes

References

External links

 The Twelve Tribes at The Jewish Encyclopedia
 The Twelve Tribes of Israel at the Jewish Virtual Library

 
12 tribes of Israel
Judaism-related lists
Kingdom of Israel (united monarchy)
Tribes of Asia
12 (number)